John Fane (9 July 1775 – 4 October 1850),  of Wormsley nr. Watlington, Oxfordshire, was a British Tory politician.

Background
A member of the Fane family headed by the Earl of Westmorland, Fane was the son of John Fane, of Wormsley, Oxfordshire, and Lady Elizabeth, daughter of Thomas Parker, 3rd Earl of Macclesfield.

Political career
Fane succeeded his father as Member of Parliament for Oxfordshire in 1824, a seat he held until 1831. He also served as High Sheriff of Oxfordshire in 1835.

An anti-Catholic, he generally supported the Tory line.

Family
Fane married Elizabeth, daughter of William Lowndes-Stone-Norton, in 1801. They had several children, including his heir John Fane, Reverend Frederick Adrian Scrope Fane (1810–1894) and George Augustus Scrope Fane (1817–1860).  He died in October 1850. His wife survived him by 15 years and died in November 1865.

References

External links 
 
 Darryl Lundy's thePeerage.com page
 

1775 births
1850 deaths
Members of the Parliament of the United Kingdom for English constituencies
Tory MPs (pre-1834)
UK MPs 1820–1826
UK MPs 1826–1830
UK MPs 1830–1831
High Sheriffs of Oxfordshire
John